The 1997 Cal State Northridge Matadors football team represented California State University, Northridge as a member of the Big Sky Conference during the 1997 NCAA Division I-AA football season. Led by Jim Fenwick in his first and only season as head coach, Cal State Northridge finished the season with an overall record of 6–6 and a mark of 4–4 in conference play, placing in the three-way tie for fourth place in the Big Sky. The team outscored its opponents 370 to 316 for the season. The Matadors played home games at North Campus Stadium in Northridge, California.

After the season, the Matadors were forced to forfeit two of their non-conference wins due to the use of three ineligible players. The two forfeits dropped their overall record to 4–8.

Schedule

References

Cal State Northridge
Cal State Northridge Matadors football seasons
Cal State Northridge Matadors football